
Gmina Łochów is an urban-rural gmina (administrative district) in Węgrów County, Masovian Voivodeship, in east-central Poland.

Villages
Apart from the town of Łochów, Gmina Łochów contains the villages and settlements of Baczki, Barchów, Brzuza, Budziska, Burakowskie, Dąbrowa, Gwizdały, Jasiorówka, Jerzyska, Kalinowiec, Kaliska, Kamionna, Karczewizna, Laski, Łazy, Łojew, Łopianka, Łosiewice, Majdan, Matały, Nadkole, Ogrodniki, Ostrówek, Pogorzelec, Samotrzask, Szumin, Twarogi, Wólka Paplińska, Zagrodniki and Zambrzyniec.

Neighbouring gminas
Gmina Łochów is bordered by the gminas of Brańszczyk, Jadów, Korytnica, Sadowne, Stoczek and Wyszków.

References

External links
 Polish official population figures 2006

Lochow
Węgrów County